At the 1908 Summer Olympics in London, England, an official football tournament between national representative selections was contested for the first time; football had been played between club teams at the Games of 1900 and 1904. 

Eight entries were accepted, and were included in the tournament draw, including two from France: the main team and a B team. Both Hungary and Bohemia both withdrew after the draw and before the start of play, leaving six teams to contest the tournament.

Great Britain won the gold medal representing the United Kingdom (Great Britain and Ireland), although all the players were from England.

Sophus "Krølben" Nielsen of Denmark set a record by scoring 10 goals in a 17–1 win over France A. The famous mathematician Harald Bohr, brother of the even more famous Niels Bohr, also played for Denmark, who won the silver medal.

Competition schedule
The match schedule of the tournament.

Venue

Squads

Bracket

Tournament 
The matches:

With eight entries, the tournament draw had a full quarterfinal round of four matches.

First round

Semi-finals

Bronze medal match
Originally, all six teams eliminated before the final were to participate in a consolation tournament for the bronze medal, with two first-round matches to be played on 21 October between the four quarter-final losers. 

After Bohemia and Hungary withdrew, the first round was scratched on 15 October, meaning France B and Sweden qualified automatically for the semi-finals of the consolation tournament.

These teams and the two semi-final losers, France and the Netherlands, were scheduled to play the semi-finals on October 23, with the French teams being drawn against each other and the Netherlands drawn against Sweden, with the winners to play off in the bronze medal match prior to the gold medal match on October 24.

However, both the French teams had returned home immediately following their crushing defeats to Denmark; therefore, their semi-final and the October 24 bronze medal match were scratched, with the Netherlands v Sweden semi-final becoming the bronze medal match.

Gold medal match

Medal summary

Medal table

Medalists 
Complete list of medal winners:

Statistics

Goalscorers

11 goals

  Sophus Nielsen

8 goals

  Vilhelm Wolfhagen 

6 goals

  Harold Stapley 

4 goals

  Clyde Purnell 

3 goals

  Nils Middelboe 
  Vivian Woodward 

2 goals

  Harald Bohr 
  August Lindgren 
  Frederick Chapman 
  Robert Hawkes 

1 goal

  Émile Sartorius 
  Arthur Berry 
  Jops Reeman 
  Edu Snethlage 
  Gustaf Bergström

Goalkeeping

Bibliography

References

 
1908
Football
1908 in association football
1908
1908–09 in English football
1908–09 in Danish football
1908–09 in Dutch football
1908–09 in French football
1908 in Swedish football